The Poison Springs State Forest encompasses  in Ouachita and Nevada counties in the U.S. state of Arkansas, and is under the authority of the Arkansas Forestry Commission (AFC). The name derives from the 1864 Battle of Poison Spring, so-called because of a legend about the poisoning of local water at the time of the battle. The actual battle site is preserved as Poison Springs Battleground State Park, located on  inside the forest.

Within the forest are numerous campsites, with more than 350 annual permits issued. Within that area, management is split between two state agencies. The AGFC oversees the management of the Poison Springs State Forest Sand Barren portion, while the Arkansas Natural Heritage Commission (ANHC) oversees management of the Arkansas Oak Natural Area and the Oak-Pine Forest Preserve Natural Area.

References

External links

Protected areas of Nevada County, Arkansas
Protected areas of Ouachita County, Arkansas